Not to be confused with George Frederic Watts.

George Fiddes Watt (15 February 1873 – 22 November 1960) was a Scottish portrait painter and engraver.

Biography

Watt studied art at Gray's School of Art, Edinburgh and the Royal Scottish Academy, Edinburgh. He was elected to the Royal Society of Arts (RSA) in 1924 and received an honorary LL.D. degree from the University of Aberdeen in 1955.

Watt was sculpted by Henry Snell Gamley in 1912, Watt's son Albert having been sculpted by Gamley four years previously. A bronze statue of Watt by Thomas Bayliss Huxley-Jones, made in 1942, is in Aberdeen.

Works

Watt's large output includes paintings of many famous people of his time in Britain. An exception among the many portraits is a landscape, J. P. Inverarity Mauled by a Lioness, Somaliland .

Portraits

 Lawyers
 Viscount Haldane (Lincoln's Inn)
 Viscount Reading (Middle Temple)

 Divines
William Paterson Paterson

 Scientists
 Sir J. J. Thomson (Royal Society)

 Politicians
 H.H. Asquith
 A.J. Balfour (National Portrait Gallery)
 Edward Grey, 1st Viscount Grey of Fallodon
 Sir William Slater Brown, Lord Provost of Edinburgh

Academics
Thomas Martin Lindsay

Mezzotint engravings

 Robert Bannatyne Finlay (Royal Courts of Justice)

Collections and exhibitions

Watt's work was exhibited at the Royal Academy from 1906 to 1930. His portrait of his mother is in the Tate Gallery's collection.

Family

His third son, Alexander Stuart Watt (1909–1967) was a journalist based in Paris. Alastair Fiddes Watt (b. 1954) is also a landscape painter.

References

Bibliography

 Chamot, Mary; Farr, Dennis; Butlin, Martin. The Modern British Paintings, Drawings and Sculpture, London 1964, II.

External links
 
 Wattart.com: Family: George Fiddes Watt
 Invaluable: George Fiddes Watt
 Aberdeen Art Gallery: portrait of George Fiddes Watt, 1911

1873 births
1960 deaths
19th-century engravers
19th-century Scottish painters
20th-century British printmakers
20th-century engravers
20th-century Scottish painters
Alumni of Gray's School of Art
Alumni of the Royal Scottish Academy
Artists from Aberdeen
Scottish engravers
Scottish male painters
Scottish portrait painters
19th-century Scottish male artists
20th-century Scottish male artists